Christopher Dawes may refer to:

Christopher Dawes (author) (born 1961), British journalist and author
Chris Dawes (Jamaican footballer) (born 1974), retired Jamaican footballer
Chris Dawes (Australian footballer) (born 1988), Australian rules footballer

See also 
 Dawes (surname)